Latorica (pronounced: Latoritsa; , translit.: Latorytsia) is a river in the watershed of the Danube. Its source is in the Ukrainian Carpathians (Eastern Carpathian Mountains), near the village . It flows from Ukraine (156.6 km) to Slovakia (31.4 km), 188 km in total and west through the towns Svaliava, Mukachevo, Solomonovo, Chop and Veľké Kapušany. Its confluence with the Ondava, in Zemplín, gives rise to the Bodrog river, itself a tributary of the Tisza.

A part of its watershed (Latorica Protected Landscape Area, "Ramsar site No. 606", 44.05 km2) was added to the Ramsar list of wetlands of international importance since 1993.

References

External links
Ramsar database entry

Rivers of Zakarpattia Oblast
Rivers of Slovakia
International rivers of Europe
Ramsar sites in Slovakia